Gottlieb Bender Christiansen (October 27, 1851 – September 27, 1929) was an American Lutheran Minister who served as President at Trinity Seminary in Blair, Nebraska and was the first president of the United Danish Evangelical Lutheran Church.

Background
G.B. Christiansen was born in Røjle Mark, Vejlby Parish, Odense County, Denmark. His parents were Christian Gottliebsen and Else Cathrine Nielsdatter. He came to America with his betrothed Jensine Larsen on August 15, 1877, via the SS Gellert (part of the Hamburg German American line). From 1877–1881, he attended Augsburg Seminary in Minneapolis, Minnesota. He was ordained on June 23, 1881, at Shell Rock, Iowa. He died September 27, 1929, at the Ebenezer Home in Brush, Colorado, later Buried in Elk Horn, Iowa.

Career
He served as Pastor at Our Savior's Lutheran Church in Council Bluffs, Iowa from 1881–1885.
In 1886, he was called to Owatonna Danish Lutheran Congregation in Owatonna, Minnesota.  Rev. Christiansen served there until 1890.  He was also Pastor at Trinity Lutheran Church in Albert Lea, Minnesota from 1885–1890. On January 1, 1889, Reverend Christiansen came to serve Brorson Danish Evangelical Lutheran Church.

Pastor Christiansen was called to be the second president of Trinity Seminary in Blair, Nebraska in 1890. He served as both President and theological professor at Trinity Seminary until 1896.  He was also Pastor for congregations in Blair, Nebraska area during this period.

Christiansen was called to be the first president of the newly formed United Danish Evangelical Lutheran Church from 1896–1921. The United Danish Evangelical Lutheran Church was organized at Minneapolis on October 1, 1896 from the merger of the Danish Association of 1884 and the Danish North Church of 1894.  
 
He was named Knight of the Order of Dannebrog by King Christian X of Denmark during 1921.
He retired from active ministry and moved to Brush, Colorado during 1922.

Selected works
  Vink for Gennemlæsning af Bibelen(Blair, Nebraska. 1918) Which is translated into "tips for reading the bible"  Danish
 Recollections of Our Church Work (published posthumously. United Danish Evangelical Lutheran Church: 1930) English

References

Additional sources
Christensen, William E. Saga of the Tower: A History of Dana College and Trinity Seminary (Blair, Nebraska: Lutheran Publishing House, 1959)
Petersen, Peter L. A Place Called Dana: The Centennial History of Trinity Seminary and Dana College (Blair, Nebraska: Dana College, 1984)
Jensen, John M. The United Evangelical Lutheran Church: An Interpretation (Minneapolis: Augsburg Publishing House, 1964)
Nyholm, Paul C. The Americanization of the Danish Lutheran Churches in America: A Study in Immigrant History (Minneapolis: Augsburg, 1963)
Christiansen, Christopher S. - Great Great Great Grandson, Family Historian.

External links
Christiansen Society
The Danish Immigrant Museum

1851 births
1929 deaths
19th-century American Lutheran clergy
Danish Lutherans
Danish emigrants to the United States
Danish-American culture in Nebraska
Augsburg University alumni
Knights of the Order of the Dannebrog
People from Odense Municipality
20th-century American Lutheran clergy